JCDecaux Group (JCDecaux SA) is a multinational corporation based in Neuilly-sur-Seine, near Paris, France, known for its bus-stop advertising systems, billboards, public bicycle rental systems, and street furniture. It is the largest outdoor advertising corporation in the world.

The company was founded in 1964 in Lyon, France, by Jean-Claude Decaux. Over the years it has expanded aggressively, partly through acquisitions of smaller advertising companies in several countries. JCDecaux currently employs more than 10,720 people worldwide and maintains a presence in over 80 countries. In France alone, JCDecaux employs more than 3,500 people.

History 

Jean-Claude Decaux (b. in 1937) first created a company in 1955 that specialised in Outdoor advertising alongside motorways. However, as these billboards were heavily taxed by law, Jean-Claude Decaux turned towards a business model in 1964 that was based on city billboards and invented the concept of advertising street furniture – well-maintained bus shelters fully funded by advertisers.

Since the first concept of the bus shelter in 1964, JCDecaux has grown offer different types of street furniture. In the 70s, JCDecaux launched its first Citylight Information Panels (CIPs), a 2m² billboard with signage to indicate directions in cities to drivers. The first fully accessible automatic amenities were installed in San Francisco in 1994, although, in 1981, JCDecaux established a system of automatic public amenities in France. In 1981, JCDecaux also developed the News Electronic Journal, which broadcast news relating to culture, sport, associations and information about the city.

JCDecaux then bought the Société Fermière des Colonnes Morris. The Senior billboards, which measure 8m² and allow multiple ads on a single site, were created in the 1980s. The first scrolling billboards appeared in 1988, which increased the number of advertising panels without raising the number of structures.

In 1999, the group acquired Havas Media Communication and Avenir. This acquisition allowed the group to expand into the large-format advertising market and into advertising in airports. In 2001, JCDecaux entered the Euronext Stock Exchange with an opening share price of €16,50. In 2002, Jean-Claude Decaux passed the management of the company on to two of his three sons, Jean-Charles Decaux and Jean-François Decaux, who then became co-CEOs of the company.

JCDecaux installed its first rental system of self-service bicycles in Vienna in 2003 and then in Lyon in 2005. In 2007, JCDecaux won a tender for Paris’ street furniture and bicycle rental system. Today, JCDecaux has a fleet of 52,000 bicycles now present in 70 cities, operated under the brand Cyclocity.

In 2011, JCDecaux acquired MediaKiosk (a company that own kiosks in France) as the main shareholder.

As part of the open data movement, JCDecaux made available its data system of the rental bike service in 2013. The company is also recognized for its commitment to sustainable development and holds an ISO 14001 certification.

In January 2022, JCDecaux reported its 2021 revenue as $3.06 billion, an increase of 18.7%, which was perceived as an indication that the out-of-home market had recovered from the disruption caused by the Covid-19 pandemic restrictions of the previous years.

Activities 

The JCDecaux Group specialises in advertising street furniture, large-format billboards, advertising on public transport, and self-service bicycle rental systems.

Street furniture 

Advertising street furniture was a concept invented by Jean-Claude Decaux. Street furniture includes bus shelters, Morris Columns, City Information Panels (CIP/MUPIs) and kiosks. Such formats enable advertisers to reach city centres, where large-format billboards are not available. Cities can retain a portion of the advertising panels for their own use. In some countries, JCDecaux holds a contract in shopping malls.

In order to adapt street furniture to the environment, JCDecaux works with internationally renowned designers, such as: Mario Bellini, Philip Cox, Peter Eisenman, Norman Foster, Zaha Hadid, Patrick Jouin, Philippe Starck, Robert Stern, Martin Szekely and Jean-Michel Wilmotte. JCDecaux also has a Design Office, which works to improve and modernise furniture.

Street furniture also includes a range of non-advertising sites, such as self-service toilets (Sanisettes), electronic newspapers and interactive kiosks next to public benches, bins, columns, road signs, glass batteries and paper containers.

Transport advertising 

The term transport includes outdoor advertising in airports, on the underground, on buses, trams, and on taxis. JCDecaux operates concessions in 150 airports and more than 300 subways, trains, trolleys and bus stations.
In 2013, advertising in Transport accounted for 37.9% of JCDecaux's revenue.

Billboard advertising 

Billboard advertising includes advertising billboards of more than 8m². These formats can be adapted for many different purposes, such as for event artworks (for example: building wraps), which is operated by JCDecaux under the brand Artvertising.

Individuals are offered the opportunity to lease part of their property (i.e. wall or garden) to JCDecaux as a billboard site.

Bicycle rental systems

The public bicycle rental systems are each financed by local advertising operators, in most cases in return for the cities signing over a 10-year licence to exploit citywide billboards. The overall scheme is called Cyclocity by the company, but each city's system has an individual name.

The cities that have implemented JCDecaux's bicycle rental systems are listed below.

To sort this table by any column, click on the  icon next to the column title.

Worldwide presence 

JCDecaux operates in more than 75 countries across five continents. 77.9% of JCDecaux's annual revenue comes from outside of France.

Europe

JCDecaux originated in France and quickly became established abroad, with its first foreign contracts in Belgium in 1966 and then in Portugal in 1971.

Thanks to its partnership with Wall AG, the company settled in Germany in 1982 and then in Turkey in 1996.

JCDecaux UK was founded in the United Kingdom in 1984 and is the market leader in outdoor advertising.
In 2005, JCDecaux UK unveiled the UK's tallest outdoor advertising structure: the M4 Torch. JCDecaux won several important contracts such as: a contract for Outdoor Advertising at St Pancras International in London (2011), and National Rail Outdoor Advertising and BAA Advertising Contracts at Heathrow, Heathrow Express, Aberdeen, Edinburgh, and Glasgow Airports. In 2010, JCDecaux completed the acquisition of UK rival Titan Outdoor. In 2015, JCDecaux won the Transport for London (TfL) bus shelter advertising contract.

JCDecaux can now be found in most European countries, including Luxembourg (1985), the Netherlands (1986), Finland (1989), Sweden (1989), Spain (1990), Slovakia (1990), Czech Republic (1995), Norway (1998), Ireland (1999), Poland (1999) and in Hungary (2012). JCDecaux can also be found in the Baltic states (2002), Bulgaria (2007), and in Ukraine (2007). Additionally, JCDecaux is present in Denmark (AFA JCDecaux Denmark) since 1989, in Italy (IGPDecaux) since 1995, in Iceland (AFA JCDecaux Iceland) since 1998, in Switzerland (APG|SGA) since 1999, in Austria (Gewista) since 2001, in Croatia and in Slovenia (Europlakat) since 2001, in Serbia (Alma Quattro) since 2003 and in Russia (Russ Outdoor) since 2007 through equity or joint ventures.

North America

JCDecaux has been present in the United States since 1993 in major cities and in 26 US airports, including New York, Washington DC and Los Angeles. JCDecaux entered Canada in 2002.

Its North America division has its head office in 350 Fifth Avenue in Midtown Manhattan, New York City.

South America

JCDecaux moved into Brazil and Argentina in 1998. The company is also a part of the outdoor market in Argentina, Uruguay (2000), and Chile (2001). JCDecaux won a contract for 1000 digital clocks in São Paulo (2012), completing the acquisition of 85% of EUMEX.

Middle East and Africa

The company's operation also covers the Middle East with offices established in Dubai and Abu Dhabi in the United Arab Emirates, Doha in Qatar, Tel Aviv in Israel, as well as Riyadh, Jeddah, Dammam and Madinah in Saudi Arabia. JCDecaux signed a 20-year exclusive street furniture contract to provide the City of Muscat, the capital of the Sultanate of Oman, with a wide range of advertising street furniture.

JCDecaux is present in six African countries: Algeria (2007), Cameroon (2011), Côte d'Ivoire (2011), South Africa (2011), Tanzania (2016), Botswana (2016), and Nigeria (2017).

Asia and Oceania

JCDecaux expanded to Australia in 1997.
In Asia, JCDecaux can be found in Singapore and Thailand (1999), Japan (2000, as MCDecaux) and South Korea (2001). JCDecaux entered China in 2004, in seven airports, including Hong Kong, Shanghai and Beijing. The company also has a presence in India (2006), Uzbekistan (2006), Kazakhstan (2007) and Mongolia (2014).

JCDecaux maintains most of the bus stops and MUPIs in the NDMC area in Delhi.

In 2018, the company acquired Australian outdoor advertising company APN Outdoor.

In March 2020, JCDecaux reported that they had been disinfecting bus shelters in Delhi as an effective method to combat the spread of Covid-19.

In April 2022, JCDecaux Australia appointed Max Eburne as their CCO, who confirmed that OOH was "stronger than ever before" and was coming out of the period of considerable losses during the COVID-19 restrictions period.

Public engagement
On 8 May 2021, for World Ovarian Cancer Day, JCDecaux participated in the Cure our Ovarian Cancer Foundation's international awareness campaign. Their spot "An ad you can't miss, for a cancer you do", which shows 30 women who had been diagnosed with ovarian cancer, was screened at Piccadilly Circus, London and Time Square, New York City. The spot was a pro bono production by Topham Guerin with JCDecaux and Landsec sponsoring the screening space.

In 2020, JCDecaux in Australia used its network to express their gratitude to health care professionals and essential business workers for their efforts during the Covid-19 pandemic and also raised awareness of mental health issues. At the same time the company, together with Broadsheet Media, appealed for people to use local businesses informing the public on the “out of home” furniture about changes local businesses had made during the Coronavirus lockdown, e.g. restaurants offering takeaways.

JCDecaux realized the potential benefits of extending their long-term campaign for mental health charity 'R U OK?' to supporting society in tougher times through using their platforms for social good messaging, encouraging Australians to ‘stay connected’ by phone or digital media when they cannot meet up in person and connecting communities and organisations regardless of their geographical locations.

See also

MCDecaux – Joint venture between JCDecaux and Mitsubishi Corporation.
And rival outdoor advertising companies:
 Clear Channel Outdoor
 Lamar Advertising Company
 Outfront Media (formerly CBS Outdoor)
 Pattison Outdoor Advertising (Canada)

References

External links

Advertising agencies of France
Outdoor advertising agencies
French companies established in 1964
Marketing companies established in 1964
French business families
Mass media in Paris
Bicycle sharing companies
Companies listed on Euronext Paris